Valentine Leight General Store, also known as V. Leight New Store, Leight Mercantile Co., and Garden of Eva, is a historic general store located at House Springs, Jefferson County, Missouri.  It was built in three stages between about 1894 and 1910, and is a one- to two-story, frame building with Late Victorian style detailing. It is sheathed in weatherboard and measures 88 feet wide by 40 feet deep.

It was listed on the National Register of Historic Places in 1992.

References 

Commercial buildings on the National Register of Historic Places in Missouri
Victorian architecture in Missouri
Commercial buildings completed in 1910
Buildings and structures in Jefferson County, Missouri
National Register of Historic Places in Jefferson County, Missouri
1910 establishments in Missouri
General stores in the United States